John Mitchell (born 12 March 1952) is an English former footballer who played as a forward in the Football League.

At Fulham he played in the 1975 FA Cup Final. During their run to the final Mitchell scored the winning goal in the last minute of extra time of the semi-final replay against Birmingham City, and he also scored in the original semi-final tie that finished 1-1.

References

External links
John Mitchell's Career

1952 births
Living people
English footballers
Sportspeople from St Albans
Association football forwards
Fulham F.C. players
St Albans City F.C. players
Millwall F.C. players
English Football League players
FA Cup Final players